The O'Reilly House, known officially known as the Father Miguel O'Reilly House Museum, and also known as the House of Don Lorenzo de Leon, is a historic home in St. Augustine, Florida. It is located at 131 Aviles Street. On October 15, 1974, it was added to the U.S. National Register of Historic Places.

The museum's exhibits focus on the Catholic heritage of St. Augustine.

References

External links

The official website for O'Reilly house is http://fatheroreilly.house. The old address oreillyhouse.org was commandeered and is spreading viruses while maintaining the look of the official site.
St. Johns County listings at National Register of Historic Places
St. Johns County listings at Florida's Office of Cultural and Historical Programs at Florida's Office of Cultural and Historical Programs

Gallery

Houses on the National Register of Historic Places in Florida
Museums in St. Augustine, Florida
National Register of Historic Places in St. Johns County, Florida
Historic house museums in Florida
Religious museums in Florida
Houses in St. Johns County, Florida
Historic American Buildings Survey in Florida